Michael Lantz (born April 6, 1908 – April 1988) was an American sculptor and medalist.

Lantz attended the National Academy of Design and the Beaux-Arts Institute of Design, and also worked as a "handy boy" in the sculptor Lee Lawrie's New York studio for ten years. In 1938, while working as an instructor for the Works Progress Administration (WPA), he won a competition to create two statues for the Federal Trade Commission Building in Washington, D.C. 247 artists entered the anonymous competition organized by the Department of the Treasury. The models that Lantz submitted for the competition are now in the collections of the Smithsonian American Art Museum.

Lantz created other sculptures for buildings and sites across the United States, including a statue of St. Avoid for the Lorraine American Cemetery and Memorial near St. Avoid, France. He also designed commemorative and historical medals and seals, including one in the Smithsonian American Art Museum.

Lantz was a member of the National Sculpture Society, where he was editor of its publication, the Sculpture Review, from 1955 to 1957 and 1973 to 1984, and served as its president from 1970 to 1973. He was awarded the Saltus Award in 1968. In 1951 he was elected into the National Academy of Design as an Associate member and became a full Academician in 1954.

Lantz's brother Walter Lantz is well known as the creator of Woody Woodpecker. The National Sculpture Society awards the Walter and Michael Lantz Prize on an annual basis. Winners include Andrew DeVries in 1991.

Selected works
 Man Controlling Trade, Apex Building, Washington D.C., Federal Art Project, 1942
 The Bronze Medallion, the highest award conferred upon civilians by New York City.

References

1908 births
1988 deaths
20th-century American sculptors
20th-century American male artists
American male sculptors
Section of Painting and Sculpture artists
Federal Art Project artists
American medallists